Grenville Astill is a professor in the department of archaeology at the University of Reading. Astill is a specialist in Medieval urbanisation, the medieval countryside and landscape archaeology, monasticism and technology and industry.

He received a Phd from the University of Birmingham. Astill is a director of the Bordesley Abbey Project.

Awards and honours 
Astill was elected as a Fellow of the Society of Antiquaries in 1988.

Selected publications
Medieval Farming and Technology: The Impact of Agricultural Change in Northwest Europe (edited with J. Langdon), 1997
"Community, Identity and the Later Anglo-Saxon Town", in W. Davies, G. Halsall and A. Reynolds (eds), People and Space in the Middle Ages, 300-1300, Turnhout, 2006, 233-54.
"Medieval Towns and Urbanization", in R. Gilchrist and A. Reynolds (eds), 1957-2007. SMA Anniversary Monograph, Leeds, 2009, 255-70
"Exchange, coinage and the economy of early medieval England". In J. Escalona (ed), Scale and Scale Change in Western Europe in the First Millennium. Brepols.
"Overview: Trade, Exchange and Urbanisation". In S. Crawford, H. Hamerow and D. Hinton (eds), The Oxford Handbook of Anglo-Saxon Archaeology. Oxford University Press.

References 

Year of birth missing (living people)
Academics of the University of Reading
British archaeologists
Living people
Alumni of the University of Birmingham